Franko Škugor was the defending champion but chose not to participate.

Jordan Thompson won the title after defeating Mathias Bourgue 6–3, 6–2 in the final.

Seeds

Draw

Finals

Top half

Bottom half

References
Main Draw
Qualifying Draw

Kunming Open - Men's Singles